The Santo Toribio District is one of 10 districts of the Huaylas Province in the Ancash Region of Peru. The capital of the district is the village of Santo Toribio.

Location
The district is located in the north-western part of the province at an elevation of 2,860m.

Populated places
Populated places in the district with the number of households in parenthesis.
 Santo Toribio (288)
 Pashpac (7)
 Quisuar (8)
 Tambo (13)
 San Lorenzo (44)
 Union Bellavista (67)
 Quitacocha (1)
 Rurin Ura (2)
 Iscap (229)
 Huayran (222)
 Quecuas (193)
 Nahuinyacup (60)
 Cullash Punro (1)

See also 
 Kushuru

References

External links
  Official website of the Huaylas province
  Official website of the Santo Toribio district

Districts of the Huaylas Province
Districts of the Ancash Region